The following are public holidays (Amharic: የኢትዮጵያ ብሔራዊ በዓል),(Oromo: Ayaanoota Biyyoolessaa Itiiyoopiyaa ) in Ethiopia.  Many holidays follow the Ethiopian Orthodox Tewahedo Church.

National holiday

Religious holidays

Ethiopian Orthodox Tewahedo Church holidays

Islamic holidays
In addition, the following Muslim holidays, which may take place at any time of the year, are observed as public holidays:

Holidays under the Derg communist rule (1974–1991)

References

 
Ethiopia
Holidays
Ethiopian culture